This is the discography of the Australian musician, singer, composer, painter and television host and personality Rolf Harris, from 1959 to 2013.

Albums

Studio albums

Live albums

Compilation albums

Singles

Charting singles 

"Tie Me Kangaroo Down, Sport" charted in 1963 was a U.S. re-recording

Notes

References

Rolf Harris
Discographies of Australian artists